Nagua is the capital of María Trinidad Sánchez province, in the northeastern Dominican Republic. 

A medium-sized town, Nagua's economy relies on the production of agricultural products, principally rice, coconuts, and cocoa bean. Located on the north of the Samaná Peninsula, Nagua lies on the highway leading from Puerto Plata to the city of Samaná.

Location
Most of the town lies below sea level, which some believe makes Nagua susceptible to flooding that could destroy a substantial part of the town. In fact, during the reign of Rafael Trujillo (1930–1961), the neighboring town of Matanza, also below sea level, was destroyed by flooding caused by a magnitude 8.0 earthquake, in 1946. Many residents of Matanza chose to resettle in the area that is now Nagua. Matanza is now a small town called Matancita, just south of the city limits of Nagua.

Climate

Economy

The economy of the municipality of Nagua is based mainly on the agricultural sector. Agriculture in the municipality is based mainly on the following products: rice, coconut, cocoa, peanuts, oranges and root vegetables. The livestock sector has some 69 farms dedicated to dairy production, with a total of 9,379 head of cattle. Which produce about 15,534 liters of milk per day.

The constant migrations of locals that occur contribute to improving the economy, due to remittances. This is one of the reasons why there have been constructions and investments contributing to economic growth in recent years. Another cause that contributes to the economic development of the municipality is the installation of branches of the various banks that operate in the country. As well as other contributions made by businessmen, especially in its industries, block factories, pharmacies, various businesses, among others.

In addition, since the municipality is bordered by an extensive beach area, this facilitates the construction of hotels and restaurants, in order to make internal tourism more effective, efficient and frequent.

Notables
Baltimore Orioles pitcher Ubaldo Jiménez was born in Nagua.
Oakland Athletics pitcher Jordan Norberto was born in Nagua.
St. Louis Cardinals utilityman Yairo Muñoz was born in Nagua.
Cieguito de Nagua Bartolo Alvarado was a musician known for playing merengue and bachata.
Nolito de Nagua Chap was a musician known for playing Haitian music.
Tatico Henriquez which some consider to be the godfather of merengue tipico.

References 

Populated places in María Trinidad Sánchez Province
Municipalities of the Dominican Republic